Macroeuphractus is a genus of extinct armadillos from the Late Miocene to Late Pliocene of South America. The genus is noted for its large size, with Macroeuphractus outesi being the largest non-pampathere or glyptodont armadillo discovered, as well as its specializations for carnivory, unique among all xenarthrans.

Description 
There are three currently recognised species of Macroeuphractus: M. outesi, M. retusus and M. moreni. The former, the type species, is known from one specimen from the Late Pliocene of Buenos Aires, Argentina. This specimen is composed of a fairly well preserved skull as well as numerous post-cranial elements.

Species 
 M. retusus is known from a single lower jaw from the Cerro Azul Formation, central Argentina
 M. moreni is known from various Late Miocene and Pliocene sites in the Río Quinto, Ituzaingó, Epecuén and Saldungaray Formations, Argentina and the Umala and La Paz Formations, Bolivia

Classification 
Macroeuphractus is traditionally grouped with euphractines; it was named after its similarity with Euphractus itself. The most recent phylogenetic examinations confirm its status as at least a sister group to euphractines, along with Paleuphractus, Doellotatus and Proeuphractus.

Biology 
Macroeuphractus is one of the few known xenarthrans to have specialised extensively for a carnivorous lifestyle. Modern euphractine armadillos (such as the modern six-banded armadillo) are fairly dedicated omnivores, but Macroeuphractus shows several features that indicate hypercarnivory:
 large, conical caniniform teeth
 an enlarged temporal fossa
 more developed muscles pertaining to the temporalis musculature (as evidenced by the more prominent muscle scars)
 a deeper rostrum
 more powerful anterior teeth (particularly in the enlarged and caniniform M2)
 a deeper and more robust zygomatic arch
 a greater moment arm of the temporalis muscle than in other armadillos

These features are unusual among xenarthrans but are more in line with predatory mammal groups.

Like most armadillos, Macroeuphractus was fossorial, and it probably could dig out small and medium-sized mammals such as caviomorph rodents, small notoungulates and argyrolagoidean paucituberculates. Species like Macroeuphractus outesi were fairly large and presumably had an apex predator status in their faunal communities.

Paleoecology 
Macroeuphractus moreni was a rather widespread species, and played a role in various faunal communities in the Miocene and Pliocene epochs of South America, while the other two species had a more limited range in Argentina. The genus occurs in an epoch where sparassodonts, phorusrhacids and sebecids entered in decline, and was among the various mammal groups to exploit this ecological vacancy prior to the arrival of North American carnivorans in the Pleistocene, alongside giant opossums such as Thylophorops. Nonetheless, Macroeuphractus still co-existed with late surviving sparassodonts such as Thylacosmilus and phorusrhacids like Llallawavis.

References 

Prehistoric cingulates
Pliocene xenarthrans
Prehistoric placental genera
Miocene mammals of South America
Pliocene mammals of South America
Chapadmalalan
Montehermosan
Huayquerian
Neogene Argentina
Fossils of Argentina
Cerro Azul Formation
Ituzaingó Formation
Neogene Bolivia
Fossils of Bolivia
Fossil taxa described in 1889